Phuthego Modipe is a Botswanan former footballer who played as a midfielder. He played for the Botswana national football team in 2001.

See also
Football in Botswana

External links
 

Living people
Association football midfielders
Botswana footballers
Botswana international footballers
TAFIC F.C. players
Year of birth missing (living people)